Metaspriggina is a genus of chordate initially known from two specimens in the Middle Cambrian Burgess Shale and 44 specimens found in 2012 at the Marble Canyon bed in Kootenay National Park.

 

Whilst named after the Ediacaran organism Spriggina, later work has shown the two to be unrelated. Metaspriggina is considered to represent a primitive chordate, possibly transitional between cephalochordates and the earliest vertebrates, albeit this has been questioned because it seems to possess most of the characteristics attributed to craniates. It lacked fins and it had a weakly developed cranium, but it did possess two well-developed upward-facing eyes with nostrils behind them.

Metaspriggina also possessed a notochord, along with seven pairs of pharyngeal bars, possibly made of cartilage. Surprisingly they were not formed from a singular bone, but they were formed of multiple separate pairs of bones, along with first two of them that were enlarged compared to the others and that seemed to not support any gills, all of these characteristics suggesting a "distant link to gnathostomatans". Originally believed to be free-swimming but occasionally found on the sea floor, the fossils from Marble Canyon showing the presence of eyes and their placement suggests it lived as a filter-feeder swimming above the sea floor.

The exceptional preservation at Marble Canyon also preserved muscle detail, showing that the animal moved with a side-to-side swimming motion. In Metaspriggina the myomeral configuration has an additional ventral chevron, and a clear dorsal bend which defines a W-shaped arrangement that is directly comparable to fish.

The discovery of pharyngeal bars (gill bars) makes Metaspriggina the oldest known animal to have this feature. The first pair of pharyngeal bars later evolved to form the upper and lower jaws of vertebrates. The second pair evolved to form the hyoid arch. In vertebrates this supports the jaws and the hyoid bone anchors the base of the tongue.

The discovery of Metaspriggina makes the origins of gnathostomatans a little more confusing, as it was roughly contemporary with Pikaia. As Pikaia did not have gill bars, unlike Branchiostoma, there are two possible explanations for this. One is that the Chordate phylum split in four before Metaspriggina lived, with Metaspriggina and the other craniates (both gnathostomatans and Agnatha) grouped with Branchiostoma and the cephalochordates, and Pikaia out on a side branch. Metaspriggina is here a direct ancestor of all gnathostomatans, with the Agnatha the most closely related group. In this explanation, Pikaia is not a close relative of Craniates at all, nor of cephalochordates, but something even more primitive, and the defining feature of the craniate-cephalochordate group is their gill bars.

The other explanation is that Metaspriggina was the ancestor of all gnathostomatans, again closely related to the Agnatha to form the Chordata. However, instead of being a very primitive relative, Pikaia was the ancestor of all cephalochordates, and the gill bars evolved convergently in them somewhere between Pikaia and Branchiostoma. This might explain why Branchiostoma has such a different number of gill bars to chordates (or at least their embryos).
Considering that conodonts, the teeth elements of a type of extinct fish belonging to the Agnatha, are already found in Cambrian stage 2 (521-529 MA BP), some 20 million years before the Burgess shale, this latter explanation does not stand. The split between Agnatha and other chordates must therefore have happened earlier, during Cambrian stage 1 or even Ediacaran times.

Phylogenetic analysis suggests that Metaspriggiidae are "stem-vertebrates" along with Haikouella and the Myllokunmingiids leading to the crown vertebrates, who divided themselves into two main directions: jawless fishes like conodonts leading to the extant cyclostomes, and jawless fishes like the Cephalaspidomorph who developed armors and jaws to become the gnathostomes.

References

External links 

Cambrian chordates
Burgess Shale fossils
Prehistoric jawless fish genera
Cambrian genus extinctions